The Battle of Narela took place on 16 January 1757, at Narela, on the outskirts of Delhi, between  the Maratha Army led by Antaji Mankeshwar and an army of Ahmad Shah Abdali.

The battle
Ahmad Shah Durrani, the emperor of Afghanistan was heading towards Delhi, his yet another invasion. The Marathas had signed a treaty with the Mughal emperor in 1752 to give him protection from the foreign invader. The Maratha Peshwa had appointed Antaji Mankeshwar along with 50,000 strong Maratha force to guard the emperor. However, the Maratha troops were called back by the Peshwa for Deccan operations. As a result, most of the Maratha force left Delhi leaving behind some 3,400 troops under Antaji Mankeshwar. So, the small garrison of Marathas along with the forces of Imad-ul-Mulk and Najib-ud-daula had the responsibility to guard the Mughal capital from Durrani. Antaji was asked to move along with his contingent along the road towards Karnal to check the progress of the Afghan invader. The Marathas and Afghans collided in a fierce battle in Narela, on the outskirts of Delhi.

Aftermath
Later at night, Antaji was returning from Narela when his troops were intercepted by a huge army on the outskirts of Delhi in the night of 16–17 January.
The Marathas were completely taken by surprise, but they fought desperately and hurriedly retreated towards Faridabad, 30 km from Delhi with heavy losses. The next day, it became known that the unidentified foe who had treacherously lead a surprise attack on the Marathas, the night before was Najib-ud-daula, a courtier of the Mughal emperor. Najib betrayed the emperor and his wazir at the most critical time and moved out of Delhi with his 20,000 well equipped troops to join the invader's camp. As a result, Abdali entered Delhi with Najib-ud-Daula on 28 January 1757, and taken to the Red Fort unopposed by the Mughal Emperor in humility. Mughal Emperor was arrested and Najib was put in charge of the administration of Delhi.

In early March, Durrani sacked the holy cities of Brindaban and Mathura, slaughtering the hapless population, and the carnage was so great that Cholera broke out in the Afghan camp with 150 soldiers dying daily, due to which Ahmed Shah Abdali decided to return to Afghanistan.

References

 
  Robinson, Howard; James Thomson Shotwell (1922). "Mogul Empire and the Marathas". The Development of the British Empire. Houghton Mifflin. p. 134.
  
 

18th century in Delhi
Narela
Narela
1757 in India
Narela
1750s in the Durrani Empire